In the mathematical theory of non-standard positional numeral systems, the Komornik–Loreti constant is a mathematical constant that represents the smallest base q for which the number 1 has a unique representation, called its q-development. The constant is named after Vilmos Komornik and Paola Loreti, who defined it in 1998.

Definition
Given a real number q > 1, the series

 

Any real number  such that  has such an expansion, as can be found using the greedy algorithm.

However, for almost all , there are an infinite number of different -developments. Even more surprisingly though, there exist exceptional  for which there exists only a single -development. Furthermore, there is a smallest number  known as the Komornik–Loreti constant for which there exists a unique -development.

Value
The Komornik–Loreti constant is the value  such that

 

It has approximate value

 

The constant  is also the unique positive real root of

 

This constant is transcendental.

See also
 Euler-Mascheroni constant
 Fibonacci word
 Golay–Rudin–Shapiro sequence
 Prouhet–Thue–Morse constant

References

Mathematical constants
Non-standard positional numeral systems